Ceratitis flexuosa is a species from the kingdom Animalia, family Tephritidae. This is a genus of Tephritid or fruit flies.

References 

Dacinae
Agricultural pest insects